Jiang Qing (19 March 191414 May 1991), also known as Madame Mao, was a Chinese communist revolutionary, actress, and major political figure during the Cultural Revolution (1966–1976). She was the fourth wife of Mao Zedong, the Chairman of the Communist Party and Paramount leader of China. She used the stage name Lan Ping during her acting career (which ended in 1938), and was known by many other names. Jiang was best known for playing a major role in the Cultural Revolution and for forming the radical political alliance known as the "Gang of Four".

Jiang married Mao in Yan'an in November 1938 and served as the inaugural "First Lady" of the People's Republic of China. She served as Mao's personal secretary in the 1940s and was head of the Film Section of the Communist Party's Propaganda Department in the 1950s. Jiang served as an important emissary for Mao in the early stages of the Cultural Revolution. In 1966, she was appointed deputy director of the Central Cultural Revolution Group. She collaborated with Lin Biao to advance Mao's unique brand of Communist ideology as well as Mao's cult of personality. At the height of the Cultural Revolution, Jiang held significant influence in the affairs of state, particularly in the realm of culture and the arts, and was idolized in propaganda posters as the "Great Flagbearer of the Proletarian Revolution". In 1969, Jiang gained a seat on the Politburo. Before Mao's death, the Gang of Four controlled many of China's political institutions, including the media and propaganda. However, Jiang, deriving most of her political legitimacy from Mao, often found herself at odds with other top leaders.

Mao's death in 1976 dealt a significant blow to Jiang's political fortunes. She was arrested in October 1976 by Hua Guofeng and his allies, and was subsequently condemned by party authorities. Since then, Jiang has been officially branded as having been part of the "Lin Biao and Jiang Qing Counter-Revolutionary Cliques", to which most of the blame for the damage and devastation caused by the Cultural Revolution was assigned. Though she was initially sentenced to death, her sentence was commuted to life imprisonment in 1983. After being released for medical treatment, Jiang died by suicide in May 1991.

Early life
Jiang Qing was born in Zhucheng, Shandong province, on 19 March 1914. Her birth name was Li Shumeng. Her father was Li Dewen, a carpenter, and her mother, whose name is unknown, was Li's subsidiary wife, or concubine. Her father had his own carpentry and cabinet making workshop. After Jiang's parents had a violent argument, her mother found work as a domestic servant (some accounts cite that Jiang's mother also worked as a prostitute) and her husband separated from her. 

When Jiang enrolled in elementary school, she took the name Li Yunhe, meaning "Crane in the Clouds", by which she was known for much of her early life. Due to her socioeconomic status and the fact that she was an illegitimate child, she was looked down upon by her schoolmates and she and her mother moved in with her maternal grandparents when she started middle school. In 1926, when she was 12 years old, her father died. Her mother relocated them to Tianjin where Jiang worked as a child laborer in a cigarette factory for several months. Two years later, Jiang and her mother settled in Jinan. The following summer, she entered an experimental theater and drama school. Her talent brought her to the attention of administrators who selected her to join a drama club in Beijing where she advanced her acting skills. She returned to Jinan in May 1931 and married Pei Minglun, the wealthy son of a businessman.

Acting career
From July 1931 to April 1933, Jiang attended National Qingdao University (renamed National Shandong University in 1932) in Qingdao. She met Yu Qiwei, a physics student three years her senior, who was an underground member of the Communist Party Propaganda Department. By 1932, they had fallen in love and were living together. She joined the "Communist Cultural Front", a circle of artists, writers, and actors, and performed in Put Down Your Whip, a renowned popular play about a woman who escapes from Japanese-occupied north-eastern China and performs in the streets to survive. In February 1933, Jiang took the oath of the Chinese Communist Party with Yu at her side, and she was appointed member of the Chinese Communist Party youth wing. Yu was arrested in April the same year and Jiang was subsequently shunned by his family. She fled to her parents' home and returned to the drama school in Jinan. Through friendships she had previously established, she received an introduction to attend Shanghai University for the summer where she also taught some general literacy classes. In October, she rejoined the Communist Youth League and, at the same time, began participating in an amateur drama troupe.

In September 1934, Jiang was arrested and jailed for her political activities in Shanghai, but was released three months later, in December of the same year. She then traveled to Beijing where she reunited with Yu Qiwei who had just been released following his prison sentence, and the two began living together again.

Jiang returned to Shanghai in March 1935, and became a professional actress, adopting the stage name "Lan Ping" (meaning "Blue Apple",). She appeared in numerous films and plays, including Goddess of Freedom, Scenes of City Life, Blood on Wolf Mountain and Wang Laowu. In Ibsen's play A Doll's House, Jiang played the role of Nora.

With her career established, she became involved with actor/director Tang Na, with whom she appeared in Scenes of City Life and Goddess of Freedom. They were married in Hangzhou in March 1936; however, he soon discovered she was continuing her relationship with Yu Qiwei. The scandal became public knowledge and he made two suicide attempts before their divorce became final. In 1937, Jiang joined the Lianhua Film Company and starred in the drama Big Thunderstorm. She reportedly had an affair with director, Zhang Min; however, she denied it in her autobiographical writings.

In 1967, at the beginning of China's Great Proletarian Cultural Revolution, Jiang declared eight works of performance art to be the new models for proletarian literature and art. These "model operas", or "revolutionary operas", were designed to glorify Mao Zedong, The People's Liberation Army, and the revolutionary struggles. The ballets White-Haired Girl, Red Detachment of Women, and Shajiabang ("Revolutionary Symphonic Music") were included in the list of eight, and were closely associated with Jiang, because of their inclusion of elements from Chinese and Western opera, dance, and music. During Richard Nixon's famous visit to China in February 1972, he watched Red Detachment of Women, and was impressed by the opera. He famously asked Jiang who the writer, director, and composer were, to which she replied it was "created by the masses."

Filmography
Note: This table only lists films from the 1930s. It does not include later documentaries.

Flight to Yan'an and marriage to Mao Zedong

Following the Marco Polo Bridge Incident on 7 July 1937, and the Japanese invasion of Shanghai, which destroyed most of its movie industry, Jiang left her celebrity life on the stage behind. She went first to Xi'an, then to the Chinese Communist headquarters in Yan'an to "join the revolution" and the war to resist the Japanese invasion. In November, she enrolled in the "Counter-Japanese Military and Political University" (Marxist–Leninist Institute) for study. The Lu Xun Academy of Arts was newly founded in Yan'an on 10 April 1938, and Jiang became a drama department instructor, teaching and performing in college plays and operas.

Shortly after arriving in Yan'an, Jiang became involved with Mao Zedong. Some communist leaders were scandalized by the relationship once it became public.  At 45, Mao was nearly twice Jiang's age, and Jiang had lived a highly bourgeois lifestyle before coming to Yan'an. Mao was still married to He Zizhen, a lifelong Communist who had previously completed the Long March with him, and with whom Mao had five children. Eventually, Mao arranged a compromise with the other leaders of the CCP: Mao was granted a divorce and permitted to marry Jiang, but she was required to stay out of public politics for twenty years. Jiang abided by this agreement. However, thirty years later, at the beginning of the Cultural Revolution, Jiang became active in politics.

On 28 November 1938, Jiang and Mao married in a small private ceremony following approval by the Party's Central Committee. Because Mao's marriage to He had not yet ended, Jiang was reportedly made to sign a marital contract which stipulated that she would not appear in public with Mao as her escort. Jiang and Mao's only child together, a daughter named Li Na, was born in 1940.

Rise to power

Entry into Chinese politics

After the founding of the People's Republic of China in 1949, Jiang became the nation's first lady. She worked as Director of Film in the Central Propaganda Department, and as a member of the Ministry of Culture steering committee for the film industry. An uproar in 1950 led to the investigation of The Life of Wu Xun, a film about a 19th-century beggar who raised money to educate the poor. Jiang supported criticism of the film for celebrating counter-revolutionary ideas.

Following the Great Leap Forward (1958–61), Mao was highly criticized within the CPC, and turned to Jiang, among others, to support him and persecute his enemies. After Mao wrote a pamphlet questioning the persistence of "feudal and bourgeois" traditional opera, Jiang took this as a license to systematically purge Chinese media and literature of everything but political propaganda. The result ended up being a near-total suppression of all creative works in China aside from rigidly-prescribed "revolutionary" material.

Cultural Revolution

Backed by her husband, she was appointed deputy director of the Central Cultural Revolution Group (CCRG) in 1966 and emerged as a serious political figure in the summer of that year. At the 9th Party Congress in April 1969, she was elevated to the Politburo. By then, she had established a close political working relationship with the other members of what later became known as the Gang of Four: Zhang Chunqiao, Yao Wenyuan and Wang Hongwen. She was one of the most powerful and controversial figures in China during Mao's last years.

During this period, Mao galvanized students and young workers as his paramilitary organization the Red Guards to attack what he termed as revisionists in the party. Mao told them the revolution was in danger and that they must do all they could to stop the emergence of a privileged class in China. He argued this is what had happened in the Soviet Union under Khrushchev.

With time, Jiang began playing an increasingly active political role in the movement. She took part in most important Party and government activities. She was supported by a radical coterie, dubbed, by Mao himself, the Gang of Four. Although a prominent member of the Central Cultural Revolution Group and a major player in Chinese politics from 1966 to 1976, she essentially remained on the sidelines.

The initial storm of the Cultural Revolution came to an end when President Liu Shaoqi was forced from all his posts on 13 October 1968. Lin Biao now became Mao's designated successor. Chairman Mao now gave his support to the Gang of Four. These four radicals occupied powerful positions in the Politburo after the Tenth Party Congress of 1973.

Jiang also directed operas and ballets with communist and revolutionary content as part of an effort to transform China's culture. She dominated the Chinese arts, and in particular attempted to reform the Beijing Opera. She developed a new form of art called the Eight model plays or "revolutionary opera" which depicted the world in simple, binary terms: the positive characters ("good guys") were predominantly farmers, workers and revolutionary soldiers, whilst the negative characters ("bad guys") were landlords and anti-revolutionaries. The negative characters, in contrast to their proletarian foils who performed boldly center stage, were identifiable by their darker make-up and relegation to the outskirts of the stage until direct conflict with a positive character. Critics would argue that her influence on art was too restrictive, because she replaced nearly all earlier works of art with revolutionary Maoist works. After the fall of the Gang of Four in the late 1970s, traditional Chinese opera and literature, as well as select foreign media, was permitted once again.

Jiang first collaborated with then second-in-charge Lin Biao, but after Lin Biao's death in 1971, she turned against him publicly in the Criticize Lin, Criticize Confucius Campaign. By the mid 1970s, Jiang also spearheaded the campaign against Deng Xiaoping (afterwards saying that this was inspired by Mao). The Chinese public became intensely discontented at this time and chose to blame Jiang, a more accessible and easier target than Chairman Mao. By 1973, although unreported due to it being a personal matter, Mao and his wife Jiang had separated:

It was reported that Mao Tsetung and Chiang Ching were separated in 1973. Most people, however, did not know this. Hence Chiang Ching was still able to use her position as Mao's wife to deceive people. Because of her relations to Mao, it was particularly difficult for the Party to deal with her.

Jiang's hobbies included photography, playing cards, and holding screenings of classic Hollywood films, especially those featuring Greta Garbo, one of her favorite actresses, even as they were banned for the average Chinese citizen as a symbol of bourgeois decadence.  When touring a troupe of young girls excelling in marksmanship, she "discovered" Joan Chen, then 14 years old, launching Joan's career as a Chinese and then international actress.

When Philippines president Ferdinand Marcos and his wife Imelda visited China in 1974, Jiang was said to be "extremely jealous" of the latter's flashy clothing, hair, and makeup.

She developed severe hypochondriasis and erratic nerves. She required two sedatives over the course of a day and three sleeping pills to fall asleep. Staff were assigned to chase away birds and cicadas from her Imperial Fishing Villa. She ordered house servants to cut down on noise by removing their shoes and preventing clothes from rustling.

Political persecution of enemies
Jiang took advantage of the Cultural Revolution to wreak vengeance on her personal enemies, including people who had slighted her during her acting career in the 1930s. She incited radical youths organized as Red Guards against other senior political leaders and government officials, including Liu Shaoqi, the President at the time, and Deng Xiaoping, the Vice Premier. Internally divided into factions both to the "left" and "right" of Jiang and Mao, not all Red Guards were friendly to Jiang.

Jiang's rivalry with, and personal dislike of, Zhou Enlai led Jiang to hurt Zhou where he was most vulnerable. In 1968, Jiang had Zhou's adopted son (Sun Yang) and daughter (Sun Weishi) tortured and murdered by Red Guards. Sun Yang was murdered in the basement of Renmin University. After Sun Weishi died following seven months of torture in a secret prison (at Jiang's direction), Jiang made sure that Sun's body was cremated and disposed of so that no autopsy could be performed and Sun's family could not have her ashes. In 1968, Jiang forced Zhou to sign an arrest warrant for his own brother. In 1973 and 1974, Jiang directed the "Criticize Lin, Criticize Confucius" campaign against premier Zhou because Zhou was viewed as one of Jiang's primary political opponents. In 1975, Jiang initiated a campaign named "Criticizing Song Jiang, Evaluating the Water Margin", which encouraged the use of Zhou as an example of a political loser. After Zhou Enlai died in 1976, Jiang initiated the "Five Nos" campaign in order to discourage and prohibit any public mourning for Zhou.

Death of Mao Zedong

On 5 September 1976, Mao's failing health turned critical when he suffered a heart attack, far more serious than his previous two earlier in the year. 

Mao's death occurred just after midnight at 00:10 hours on 9 September 1976. Mao's chosen successor, Hua Guofeng, became the chairman of his funeral committee. It was believed Hua was a compromise candidate between the free-marketeers and the party orthodox. Some argue this may have been due to his ambivalence and his low-key profile, particularly compared to Deng Xiaoping, the preferred candidate of the market-oriented factions. The party apparatus, under orders from Jiang and Zhang Chunqiao, wrote a eulogy affirming Mao's achievements in order to justify their claims to power.

By this time, state media was effectively under the control of the Gang of Four. State newspapers continued to denounce Deng shortly after Mao's death. Jiang was little-concerned about the weak Hua Guofeng, but she feared Deng Xiaoping greatly. In numerous documents published in the 1970s, it was claimed that Jiang was conspiring to make herself the new Chairman of the Communist Party.

Downfall

1976 coup
Jiang showed few signs of sorrow during the days following Mao's death. It was uncertain who controlled the Communist Party's central organs during this transition period. Hua Guofeng, as Mao's designated successor, held the titular power as the acting Chairman of the Communist Party and as Premier. However, Hua was not very influential. Some sources indicate that Mao mentioned Jiang Qing before his death in a note to Hua Guofeng, telling him to "go and consult her" if he runs into problems.

Jiang believed that upholding the status quo, where she was one of the highest-ranked members of the central authorities, would mean that she would effectively hold on to power. In addition, she believed that her status as Mao's widow would make it difficult for her to be removed. She continued to invoke Mao's name in her major decisions, and acted as first-in-charge.

Her political ambitions became notorious within the Central Committee. Ye Jianying, a renowned general, met in private with Hua Guofeng and Wang Dongxing, commander of a secret service-like organization called the 8341 Special Regiment. They determined that Jiang and her associates must be removed by force in order to restore stability.

On the morning of 6 October 1976, Jiang came to Mao's former residence in Zhongnanhai, gathered her close aides and Mao's former personal aides in a "Study Mao's Work" session. According to Du Xiuxian, her photographer, Jiang remarked that she knew people within the Central Committee were plotting against her.

After the session, Jiang took several aides to Jingshan Park to pick apples. In the evening, Jiang, Zhang Chunqiao, Wang Hongwen, and Yao Wenyuan were brutally beaten, arrested and kept in the lower level of Zhongnanhai where they were starved, tortured and interrogated. According to Zhang Yaoci, who carried out the arrest, Jiang did not say much when she was arrested. It was reported that one of her servants spat at her as she was being taken away under a flurry of blows by onlookers and police. In a bloodless coup d'état, the Gang of Four were charged with attempts to seize power by organizing militant coups in Shanghai and Beijing, subverting the government, counter-revolutionary activity, and treason.

After her arrest, Jiang was sent to the Qincheng Prison and detained for five years where she was further beaten, starved, tortured and interrogated. In both official and civilian accounts of the period, the fall of the Gang was met with celebrations all over China.

Trial

In 1980, the trials of the Gang of Four began. The trials were televised nationwide. By showing the way the Gang of Four was tried, Deng Xiaoping wanted the people to realize that a new era had begun.

Portions of the 20,000-word indictment were printed in China's press before the trial started; they accused the defendants of a host of heinous crimes that took place during the Cultural Revolution. The charges specify that 727,420 Chinese were "persecuted" during that period, and that 34,274 died, though the often vague indictment did not specify exactly how. Among the chief victims: one-time President Liu Shaoqi's widow Wang Guangmei, herself imprisoned during the Cultural Revolution for 12 years, attended the trial as an observer.

The indictment described two plots by the "Jiang Qing-Lin Biao Counter-revolutionary Clique" to seize power. Jiang was not accused of conspiring with Lin Biao, or with other members of the Gang of Four who allegedly planned an armed rebellion to "usurp power" in 1976, when Mao was close to death. Instead, the charges against her focused on her systematic persecution of creative artists during the Cultural Revolution. Amongst other things, she was accused of hiring 40 people in Shanghai to disguise themselves as Red Guards and ransack the homes of writers and performers. The apparent purpose was said to find and destroy letters, photos and other potentially damaging materials on Jiang's early career in Shanghai, which she wanted to keep secret.

Despite the seriousness of the accusations against her, Jiang appeared unrepentant. She did not confess her guilt, something that the Chinese press emphasized to show her bad attitude. There had been reports that she planned to defend herself by cloaking herself in Mao's mantle, saying that she did only what he approved. As the trial got under way, Jiang dismissed her assigned lawyers, deciding instead to represent herself. During her public trials at the "Special Court", Jiang was the only member of the Gang of Four who argued on her own behalf. The defense's argument was that she obeyed the orders of Mao at all times. Jiang maintained that all she had done was to defend Chairman Mao. It was at this trial that Jiang made the famous quote: "I was Chairman Mao's dog. I bit whomever he asked me to bite."

Death
Jiang was sentenced to death, with a reprieve of two years, in 1981. By 1983, her death sentence was commuted to life imprisonment. During this time, she made several requests to visit Mao Zedong's embalmed body in Beijing, but they were turned down. When the Tiananmen Square protests occurred, Jiang believed that the student activists were liberals rather than Maoists, but she blamed them on Deng Xiaoping, writing that "He let in all those Western ideas!"

While in prison, Jiang was diagnosed with throat cancer, but she refused an operation. She was eventually released, on medical grounds, in 1991.

At the hospital, Jiang used the name Lǐ Rùnqīng. She died by suicide on 14 May 1991, at the age of 77, by hanging herself in a bathroom of her hospital. She penned a suicide note reading, "Today the revolution has been stolen by the revisionist clique of Deng, Peng Zhen, and Yang Shangkun. Chairman Mao exterminated Liu Shaoqi, but not Deng, and the result of this omission is that unending evils have been unleashed on the Chinese people and nation. Chairman, your student and fighter is coming to see you!" Her suicide occurred two days before the 25th anniversary of the Cultural Revolution.

She wished for her remains to be buried in her home province of Shandong, but in consideration of possible future vandalism to her tomb, the state decided to have her remains moved to a safer common cemetery in Beijing. Jiang is buried in Futian Cemetery in the western hills of Beijing. Her grave is marked by a tall white stone inscribed with her school name, not the name by which she was famously known, which reads: "Tomb of Late Mother, Li Yunhe, 1914–1991".

Names of Jiang Qing 

There are several reasons for Jiang's large repertoire of names. A large part of it has to do with the fluctuating period she lived in. At the time of her birth, many female children never received given names or formal education.

Her father named her Li Jinhai (To Receive A Boy) because he wanted a son, but this was altered after her birth to Li Shumeng (Dim Lady). She enrolled in school under a more dignified name, Li Yunhe (Cloud Crane) and simply changed it for convenience to Li He.

As was customary for Chinese actors during that time, she chose a stage name, which was used in all the plays and films that credited her roles. Lan Ping (Blue Apple) was the name she was known by within Chinese film circles and a name she came to identify with.

It is unclear when she changed her name to Jiang Qing (Blue River), but it probably occurred before her arrival in Yan'an. It is believed that the character "Qing" was chosen because it related to the concept of Blue ("Lan"). There is some evidence that the name signified her status as a communist and a severance from her "bourgeois" past. She also used Li Jin to pen a number of articles she wrote during the Cultural Revolution.

Eventually, to protect her identity, she used Li Runqing (Shining Blue) when she was hospitalized after being released from prison. Her tombstone bears the name "Li Yunhe".

In English, many contemporary articles used the Wade–Giles romanization system to spell Chinese names. For this reason, some sources – especially older ones – spell her name "Chiang Ch'ing".

Birth name: 
Given name: 
School name: 
Modified name: 
Stage name: 
Revolutionary pseudonym: 
Pen name: 
Last used name: 
Commonly referred to in English-language literature as: Madame Mao

See also

 Becoming Madame Mao
 Jiang Qing and Her Husbands
 Politics of the People's Republic of China

Explanatory notes

References

Citations

General and cited sources 

 Jung Chang, Wild Swans: Three Daughters of China (London, 1990) 
 Ross Terrill, The White-Boned Demon: A Biography of Madame Mao Zedong (New York: Morrow, 1984). 
 Roxanne Witke, Comrade Chiang Ch'ing (Boston: Little, Brown, 1977). 
 Li Zhisui, The Private Life of Chairman Mao (London: Random House, 1996)

External links 

 Feature on Madame Mao by the International Museum of Women.
 Jiang Qing's tomb.
 Hudong.com, Jian Qing , 84-minute documentary film (on-line, in Chinese)

1914 births
1991 suicides
20th-century Chinese actresses
20th-century Chinese women politicians
Actresses from Shandong
Anti-revisionists
Chinese actor-politicians
Chinese Communist Party politicians from Shandong
Chinese film actresses
Chinese Maoists
Chinese Marxists
Chinese politicians convicted of crimes
Chinese politicians who committed suicide
Expelled members of the Chinese Communist Party
Gang of Four
Hypochondriacs
Mao Zedong family
Maoist theorists
Members of the 10th Politburo of the Chinese Communist Party
Members of the 9th Politburo of the Chinese Communist Party
People from Zhucheng
People with polydactyly
People's Republic of China politicians from Shandong
Politicians from Weifang
Prisoners sentenced to death by the People's Republic of China
Spouses of national leaders
Suicides by hanging in China
Suicides in the People's Republic of China
Women leaders of China
Secretaries to Mao Zedong